Les Gracques  is an unfinished play by Jean Giraudoux published after the author's death.

Original productions
Les Gracques was published posthumously in 1958 by Éditions Grasset jointly with the novel La Menteuse (English title: The Liar).

References

Plays by Jean Giraudoux
1958 plays
Unfinished plays
Éditions Grasset books